Florence Leontine Mary Welch (born 28 August 1986) is an English singer and the lead vocalist and primary songwriter of the indie rock band Florence and the Machine. The band's debut studio album, Lungs (2009), topped the UK Albums Chart and won the Brit Award for Best British Album. Their next four albums also achieved chart success. In 2018, Welch released a book titled Useless Magic, a collection of lyrics and poems written by her, along with illustrations.

Family and early life
Florence Leontine Mary Welch was born on 28 August 1986 in Camberwell, London to parents Nick Russell Welch, an advertising executive and Evelyn Welch (née Samuels), an American immigrant from New York City who was educated at Harvard University and the Warburg Institute, University of London. Evelyn is Vice-Chancellor of the University of Bristol. Through her mother, Welch has both British and American citizenship.

Welch is the niece of satirist Craig Brown via Brown's wife and Welch's aunt, Frances Welch, and granddaughter of Colin Welch (James Colin Ross Welch), former deputy editor of The Daily Telegraph and former Daily Mail parliamentary sketchwriter, originally of Cambridgeshire. Welch's maternal uncle is actor and director John Stockwell. She also has a sister, Grace, who inspired Welch's song by the same name. 
	 	  	
During her youth, Welch was encouraged by her Scottish paternal grandmother, Cybil Welch (née Russell), to pursue her performing and singing talents. Welch's deceased grandmothers inspired numerous songs on Florence and the Machine's debut album Lungs (2009). In her youth, Welch also sang at family weddings and funerals. Aged ten, she performed the song of Yum-Yum from The Mikado by Gilbert and Sullivan at Colin Welch's memorial service.

Welch's parents divorced when she was thirteen, and her mother eventually married their next-door neighbour, Professor Peter Openshaw. Around this time, her maternal grandmother, who had bipolar disorder, died from suicide. 

In Florence and the Machine's 2018 single "Hunger", she opened up for the first time about a teenage eating disorder. She has also spoken of being a highly imaginative and fearful child. "I learned ways to manage that terror – drink, drugs, controlling food..."
	
Welch was educated at Thomas's London Day School, Battersea then went on to Alleyn's School, South East London, where she did well academically. However, Welch often got in trouble in school for impromptu singing and for singing too loudly in the school's choir. 

Despite an early love of reading and literature, she was also diagnosed with mild dyslexia owing to problems with spelling, alongside dyspraxia, a developmental coordination disorder that does not affect her reading ability, but caused issues with organization. Music and books gave her a reprieve from what she felt made her different from others. "I used reading as a form of escape. I was shy and sensitive, and so reading gave me a safe space." 

On leaving secondary school and "just bumming around Camberwell where I lived, working at a bar and thought that I should start doing something with life", Welch studied illustration at Camberwell College of Arts before dropping out to focus on her music. Initially, she had intended to take a year out from her studies to "see where the music would go and then it started going somewhere so [she] never went back".

Career

2006–2010: Florence and the Machine and Lungs

According to Welch, the band name "Florence + the Machine" had "started off as a private joke that got out of hand. I made music with my friend, who we called Isabella Machine, to which I was Florence Robot. When I was about an hour away from my first gig, I still didn't have a name, so I thought 'Okay, I'll be Florence Robot/Isa Machine', before realizing that name was so long it'd drive me mad". In 2006, Welch's performances with Isabella Summers in small London venues under the joint name Florence Robot/Isa Machine began to attract notice.
In 2007, Welch recorded with a band named Ashok, who released an album titled Plans on the Filthy Lucre/About Records label. This album included the earliest version of her later hit "Kiss with a Fist", which at this point was titled "Happy Slap".

Florence and the Machine released their debut studio album Lungs in the United Kingdom on 6 July 2009. The album was officially launched with a set at the Rivoli Ballroom in Brockley, south-east London. It peaked at number one in the UK and number two in Ireland. As of 6 August 2009, the album had sold over 100,000 copies in the UK and by 10 August it had been at number two for five consecutive weeks. Following its 25 July 2009 release for download in the United States, the album debuted at number seventeen on the Billboard Heatseekers Albums chart, ultimately peaking at number one. The album was released physically in the US on 20 October by Universal Republic. The album was produced by James Ford, Paul Epworth, Steve Mackey and Charlie Hugall.

Welch contributed vocals to David Byrne and Fatboy Slim's 2010 album Here Lies Love, an album about Imelda Marcos. As of January 2011, Welch was working with Drake on material slated for his upcoming album.

On 27 February 2011, Welch replaced pregnant Dido and sang her portion of Best Original Song nominee "If I Rise" (from 127 Hours) with A. R. Rahman at the 83rd Academy Awards.

2011–12: Ceremonials and solo endeavours

The band's second studio album, Ceremonials, was released on 31 October 2011. In the album, Florence's "obsession with drowning" is represented through the use of repeated water imagery. It debuted at number one on the UK Albums Chart and number six on the US Billboard 200. On 12 January 2012, Florence and the Machine were nominated for two Brit Awards, with the awards ceremony taking place on 21 February 2012 at the O2 Arena, London. On 26 April 2012, the band released "Breath of Life", a song which was recorded as the official theme song for the fantasy film Snow White and the Huntsman. On 5 July 2012, a remix of "Spectrum" by Scottish musician Calvin Harris was released as the fourth single from Ceremonials, becoming the band's first UK number-one hit. Welch expressed excitement about putting new material together for a third album once the band finished touring at the end of September 2012. 
Welch led a tribute to Amy Winehouse by performing Winehouse's song "Back to Black" and the Annie Lennox-classic Walking on Broken Glass during the VH1 Divas Celebrates Soul concert held in December 2011. The group performed in Times Square on 31 December 2011 for the 40th annual Dick Clark's New Year's Rockin' Eve special.

In October 2012, she was featured on Scottish singer-songwriter and producer Calvin Harris' song "Sweet Nothing", which debuted at number one on the UK Singles Chart, marking Welch's second number one. The song was taken from Harris' third studio album 18 Months and is the fifth single from the album. "Sweet Nothing" also peaked at number one in Ireland and number two in Australia and New Zealand. "Sweet Nothing" was certified Platinum in Australia.
"Sweet Nothing" received a nomination for Best Dance Recording at the 56th Annual Grammy Awards.

On 29 November 2012 Florence joined the Rolling Stones at the O2 Arena in London to sing "Gimme Shelter". Her performance with Mick Jagger was described as "sexy" and "electrifying."

2015–21: Collaborations
In February 2015, Florence and the Machine announced their third album, How Big, How Blue, How Beautiful, which was released on 1 June 2015. The album reached #1 in many markets including the US, the UK, Australia, and Canada. The record spawned two top 40 UK hits, and earned three Grammy nominations.

During June 2015, Dave Grohl of the Foo Fighters broke his leg on stage prior to his band's upcoming Glastonbury Festival headline performance, causing Florence and the Machine to be the headline band. They headlined the festival for the first time on 26 June 2015.

In September 2016, during an interview with Heat Radio, American singer Lady Gaga revealed that she and Florence had recorded a song together. The track, titled "Hey Girl", was later featured on Gaga's fifth album Joanne. Footage of their studio session was featured in Gaga's Netflix documentary Gaga: Five Foot Two (2017).

In March 2017, Welch appeared in Song to Song directed by Terrence Malick.

In May 2017, Welch contributed a song titled "To Be Human" to the Wonder Woman soundtrack. Co-written with Rick Nowels, the song is performed on the film's soundtrack by Sia and Labrinth.

On 12 April 2018, Florence and the Machine released a song titled "Sky Full of Song" and an accompanying music video on YouTube, directed by AG Rojas. The song was released for Record Store Day on 21 April, which supports brick and mortar record stores; a limited edition 7" vinyl was also released. Also in 2018 "Hunger" was released. Florence and the Machine's fourth studio album High as Hope was released on 29 June 2018.

On 22 May 2018, Florence Welch performed a duet with Mick Jagger, at London Stadium, during the Rolling Stones' No Filter Tour. They sang "Wild Horses".

In July 2018, Welch published her first book Useless Magic: Lyrics and Poetry. The book showcases her lyrics and poetry, alongside corresponding artwork from the time of her first album Lungs to her 2018 release High as Hope.

On 28 April 2021, Welch announced that she would contribute music and lyrics to a musical adaptation of F. Scott Fitzgerald's The Great Gatsby, with producer Thomas Bartlett co-writing the adaptation's music and Martyna Majok writing the book and Rebecca Frecknall directing.

2022–present: Dance Fever
In January 2022, it was confirmed that the band would be headlining a few summer festivals which lead to many theorizing that Welch's fifth studio album could possibly be released during the first semester of 2022.

By the end of February, some selected fans started receiving medieval-styled tarot cards, the cards had the words "King" and "Florence + the Machine – Chapter 1" written on them. On 23 February 2022, Welch released a single, "King", and an accompanying music video, directed by Autumn de Wilde.

On 7 March 2022, the second single was released alongside a music video, also directed by de Wilde, titled "Heaven Is Here".

On 9 March 2022, Welch announced through her Instagram page that the band's fifth studio album would be titled Dance Fever and would have 14 songs, in her words "A fairytale in 14 songs".

On 10 March 2022, the third single was released called "My Love" which also featured a music video directed by Autumn de Wilde. The single premiered on BBC Radio 1's morning show "Breakfast with Greg James" where Welch was the special guest and announced the release date of their upcoming album Dance Fever, 13 May 2022.

Artistry

Welch has been compared to other singers such as Kate Bush, Stevie Nicks, Siouxsie Sioux, PJ Harvey, Shirley Manson, Alison Goldfrapp, Tori Amos and Björk. When describing Lungs, Welch said, "When I was writing these songs, I used to refer to myself as Florence 'Robot...because I really like what a machine thinks organic instruments really sound like." Welch possesses a contralto vocal range.

Influences
During interviews, Welch has cited singers Grace Slick, Alanis Morissette and Stevie Nicks as influences and "heroes." She told Rolling Stone in 2010, "I'm pretty obsessed with [Stevie] Nicks, from her style to her voice. I like watching her on YouTube and her old performances, the way she moves and everything."

She has also listed in her early influences the likes of John Cale, Otis Redding, Siouxsie Sioux, David Byrne and Lou Reed. In a review of Ceremonials, Jody Rosen of Rolling Stone described Florence and the Machine's style as "dark, robust and romantic", deeming the ballad "Only If for a Night" as a mix of "classic soul and midnight-on-the-moors English art rock". Welch stated that her lyrics related to Renaissance artists : "We're dealing with all of the same things they did: love and death, time and pain, heaven and hell".  Welch has used religious imagery in her music and performances, though she has stated, "I'm not a religious person. Sex, violence, love, death, are the topics that I'm constantly wrestling with, it's all connected back to religion."

Nick Welch, her father, contributed a "rock and roll element to the family mix"; in his twenties, he lived in a West End squat and attended the Squatters' Ball organised by Heathcote Williams where the 101ers played regularly. A self-confessed "frustrated performer", if Nick, as he put it, "nudged Flo in any way, it's only been to listen to the Ramones rather than Green Day." Evelyn, Welch's mother, had an equally strong, yet completely different influence on her daughter. A visit to one of her mother's renaissance lectures left teenage Florence deeply impressed. She explained, "I aspire to something like that, but with music. I hope that my music has some of the big themes—sex, death, love, violence—that will still be part of the human story in 200 years' time."

Image
Welch is known for her distinctive clothing style, often performing concerts wearing light Gucci dresses, barefoot and without jewellery. Vogue described her style as Bohemian and called her "the queen of Bohemian style."

When discussing her fashion style, Welch said that, "For the stage, it's The Lady of Shalott meets Ophelia...mixed with scary gothic bat lady. But in real life I'm kind of prim." Welch often mixes artistic influences both in her fashion style and music, with a strong nod towards the style of the Pre-Raphaelite Brotherhood. 2011 saw Gucci dressing her for her summer tour and a performance at the Chanel runway show at Paris Fashion Week. Welch describes 1970s American drag queen troupe the Cockettes and French chanson singer Françoise Hardy as fashion mentors.

Welch has also named Fleetwood Mac member Stevie Nicks as a musical, fashion and general influence. Welch can sometimes be seen in concert paying homage to Nicks' famous billowing stage dress.

Welch has spoken about being a "fantasist" as a child, stating, "[I was] constantly reading books, thinking, "I'm not a mermaid. I can't breathe underwater. I can't fly." One of the saddest and most heartbreaking things is that I remember really wanting to be able to magically change my appearance.", and stated that this impacted her image and sound. Her style and mannerisms have led fans and the media comparing her to a witch, a mermaid, and a fairy.

Personal life
Welch considers herself an introvert, and is passionate about reading and literature. She has held many events with her fan-run book club, Between Two Books. "It's a huge generalization to say that all readers are introverts; I'm sure there's a lot of extroverted bookworms out there, but, for me, it's nice to know people of similar inclinations can actually come together in a social way and talk about something that is inherently solitary."

Although many of her songs contain Christian themes and elements, Welch has said she does not follow any particular religion. "I went to Catholic school, and the first songs I remember liking were hymns. I find it's nice to mix the mundane and the magical, the irrelevant with the huge themes. Sex, love, death, marriage, guilt—mix that with seeing a huge sky or going for a walk or turning the page of a book. Living is dealing with the everyday and the notion that you're going to die."

Welch has been open about her struggles with anxiety and depression, as well as with alcohol. Many of her songs reflect these issues. In 2019, she discussed her panic attacks with Sinéad Burke. She explained, "My hands go tingly, my lips go tingly. I sort of think that it's very serious and I'm about to die and I have to lie on the floor and breathe…I know I'm having a panic attack, really. But I also really want someone to take me to hospital."

In 2015, Welch broke her foot after leaping off the stage at the Coachella Festival. She revealed that she used to drink alcohol before every performance, telling Billboard: "I'm quite shy, really—that's probably why I used to drink a lot. But I don't any more. When I finally took time off to make this new record, I had time to strengthen. And when I was coming back into the fray, I really didn't want to lose that. I thought I could go dive-bomb back into it, but look what happened. I dived into it and literally broke myself."

In 2022, Welch was awarded and accepted an honorary fellowship from University of the Arts London.

Political views 
In 2016, Welch voiced her support for Remain during the United Kingdoms EU Membership referendum. Welch is also a vocal advocate for LGBT rights, and regularly  waves the rainbow flag at her concerts, particularly during her song "Spectrum (Say My Name)".

In 2018, she tweeted her support for the removal of the Eighth Amendment of the Constitution of Ireland. The removal passed and legalised abortion access within the country.

In 2019, Welch expressed her support for women's rights during concerts in Las Vegas, Nevada, Chicago, Illinois, Raleigh, North Carolina and Columbia, Maryland. She encouraged her audience to donate to the ACLU instead of buying concert merchandise.

In March 2022, Florence expressed her support for Ukraine during the Russian-Ukrainian War. The Florence + the Machine video for "Heaven Is Here" was recently filmed in Kyiv, the capital of Ukraine. Welch wrote on her Twitter: "Two of the dancers in this video are currently sheltering. To my brave and beautiful sisters Maryne and Anastasiia. I love you. I wish I could put my arms around you. Strength." She also shared an article about the ways to help Ukraine. In September 2022 it was announced via Twitter that proceeds from a Florence + the Machine zine would be donated to the charitable foundation Future for Ukraine. The zine features photographs taken in November 2021 in Kyiv while shooting music videos for Dance Fever.

Discography

 Lungs (2009)
 Ceremonials (2011)
 How Big, How Blue, How Beautiful (2015)
 High as Hope (2018)
 Dance Fever (2022)

As featured artist

Notes

Album appearances

Songwriting credits

Filmography
 2017 – Song to Song
 2020 – The Third Day

Awards and nominations

References

External links

 
 
 

1986 births
21st-century English women singers
21st-century English singers
Alumni of Camberwell College of Arts
Art rock musicians
Baroque pop musicians
Brit Award winners
British indie pop musicians
British indie rock musicians
English contraltos
English people of American descent
English people of Scottish descent
English rock singers
English women singer-songwriters
Island Records artists
British LGBT rights activists
Living people
People educated at Alleyn's School
People from Camberwell
Musicians with dyslexia
Singers from London
Third British Invasion artists
Women rock singers
Florence and the Machine members